Leslie Frederick Kenny (1946 – 12 June 1976) was an Australian professional Grand Prix motorcycle road racer.

Kenny rose to prominence in Australian road racing between 1972 and 1976. He had his most successful season in 1975 when he finished the season in 52nd place in the 500cc world championship. He was killed in an accident during the 1976 Isle of Man TT.

References

1946 births
1976 deaths
350cc World Championship riders
500cc World Championship riders
Sport deaths in the Isle of Man
Australian motorcycle racers
Isle of Man TT riders
Motorcycle racers who died while racing
Place of birth missing